The 2013 NRL season will consist of 26 weekly regular season rounds starting on March 7, followed by four weeks of play-offs that culminate in the grand final on October 6.

Regular season

Round 1

Round 2

Round 3

Round 4
The Melbourne Storm will play their 400th NRL match.

 The Roosters scored 50+ for the first time since Round 13 2007, they also held their opposition to nil for the second week in a row, becoming the 17th team in History to achieve that feat, and the first team to do it since Brisbane who did it in Round 24 and Round 25 2006, it was also the 6th time (as well as the record of 3) the Roosters had achieved that feat, and the first time since Rounds 2 and 3 1999, they would do it again in Rounds 17 and 19 (bye Round 18) this season.

Round 5

Round 6

Round 7

Round 8

Round 9

Round 10

 The Warriors suffered their biggest loss and conceded their most points in a match, eclipsing the 54-0 defeat against St George Illawarra and the 58 points they conceded against the Roosters in 2000 and 2004 respectively, it was also Penrith's biggest score since 2004 and the highest score by any team since 2008.
 The West Tigers set a new club record for longest losing streak with their 7th straight loss, beating the previous record of 6 which happened twice before, the most recent of which in 2003 (and also, later on in the 2013 season).

Round 11

 The Gold Coast Titans scored their most points since coming back to the NRL in 2007, beating the 38 they scored in 2007, also against Parramatta.
 St George-Illawarra were held to nil at Kogarah for the first time in their history, and it was the first time any St George team was held to nil on the ground.

Round 12

 The Warriors scored 50+ for the first time since Round 15 2007.

Round 13

Round 14

Round 15

Round 16

 James McManus equalled the club try scoring record for Newcastle, joining Darren Albert, Adam MacDougall, Andrew Johns, Cooper Vuna and Akuila Uate as the only players to score 4 tries for the Knights.

Round 17

Round 18
For this round, NRL players selected for Game III of the 2013 State of Origin series were not available to play.

 Melbourne were held to nil for the first time since the 2008 Grand Final.

Round 19

Round 20 - Rivalry Round

Round 21

 Brett Stewart scored his 131st career try in Manly's 40-6 win over Parramatta. This was also the 5,000th try scored by the Sea Eagles since joining the competition in 1947
 The Canberra Raiders suffered their biggest loss at the hands of the Melbourne Storm, losing 68-4, it was also Melbourne's equal-biggest win, equalling the 64-0 win against the Tigers in 2001.

Round 22

Round 23

Round 24

 The Storm recorded their highest score and win at AAMI Park, after giving the Eels a 64-4 hiding, the loss all but handed the Eels their 2nd consecutive wooden spoon after the Tigers beat the Dragons the day before, which put the Tigers 3 wins clear of Parramatta with 2 games to play, the Dragons were only 2 wins clear of Parramatta at that point, but due to the differential gap between the 2 teams, it was almost impossible for them to receive it.
 This round ended the finals hopes of Brisbane and Canberra, the former losing to Penrith, who kept their slim finals hopes alive in and the process, the latter losing to Manly, who all but secured their place in the top 4 with the win.

Round 25

 The Bulldogs ended the Panthers slim finals hopes, booking themselves in the finals at the same time, this meant only Titans and Warriors were the only teams with a chance to make the finals.

Round 26

 The South Sydney-Sydney Roosters match drew the largest attendance for a standalone home and away game in the competition's history.
 The final 8 was decided after the Titans-Storm match, after the Warriors had lost earlier in the day to the Dragons, the Titans had to beat Melbourne and hope the Tigers beat the Cowboys (which didn't end up happening) for them to make the 8, despite a strong effort from the Titans they eventually went down in Golden Point to Melbourne, meaning no team could get in or fall out of the 8 from this point on.

Finals

Week 1 - Qualifying and Elimination Finals
1st Qualifying Final

1st Elimination Final

 This was the first meeting between these 2 teams in the finals
2nd Qualifying Final

 This was the first meeting between these 2 sides in the finals since 1997
2nd Elimination Final

Week 2 - Semi-finals
1st Semi-final

 This was the first time since 1996 these 2 teams played against each other in a final
2nd Semi-final

Week 3 - Preliminary Finals
1st Preliminary Final

2nd Preliminary Final

 This was the first time since 2003 that these 2 teams played off in a final.

Week 4 - Grand Final

 Daly Cherry-Evans became the 3rd man (and the first in 20 years) to win the Clive Churchill medal despite being on the losing side, the other 2 were Brad Clyde for Canberra in 1991 and Brad Mackay in 1993 for St George.
 The Roosters were playing in their first Grand Final since 2010 where they went down to the Dragons 32-8, the Sea Eagles in their first since 2011, where they beat the Warriors 24-10, it was the 2nd time these teams had played off in a Grand Final, the other being in 1972, which Manly won 19-14.
 For the first time since 2005, the 2 Grand Finalists had played each other in the Finals before the Grand Final, having played each other in week one of the Finals in the 4-0 epic.

References

National Rugby League season results
Results